Niziny may refer to the following places in Poland:
Niziny, Lower Silesian Voivodeship (south-west Poland)
Niziny, Busko County in Świętokrzyskie Voivodeship (south-central Poland)
Niziny, Jędrzejów County in Świętokrzyskie Voivodeship (south-central Poland)